Chantal Réga (born August 7, 1955, in Nîmes) is a retired track and field sprinter and hurdler from France, best known for winning the bronze medal in the women's 400 m hurdles at the 1982 European Championships. A two-time Olympian (1976 and 1980) she won a total number of fifteen national titles during the 1970s and early 1980s.

International

National Championships

 Champion of France at 100m in 1976, 1978, 1979 and 1980
 Champion of France at 200m in 1975, 1976, 1978, 1979 and 1980
 Champion of France at 100m hurdles in 1974 and 1975
 Champion of France at 400m hurdles in 1982
 Champion of France at 60m Indoors in 1977
 Champion of France at 200m Indoors in 1982
 Champion of France at 60m hurdles Indoors in 1975

References

External links
 
 
 Mediterranean Games
 European Championships

1955 births
Living people
French female sprinters
French female hurdlers
Athletes (track and field) at the 1976 Summer Olympics
Athletes (track and field) at the 1980 Summer Olympics
Olympic athletes of France
Sportspeople from Nîmes
European Athletics Championships medalists
Mediterranean Games gold medalists for France
Athletes (track and field) at the 1979 Mediterranean Games
Mediterranean Games medalists in athletics
Universiade medalists in athletics (track and field)
Universiade bronze medalists for France